

Events 
April 13 – The first Dresden opera house in Germany opens with the performance of a work by Carl Maria von Weber.
Robert Schumann writes two symphonies: Symphony No. 1 in B-flat major, opus 38 (also called the "Spring" symphony), and Symphony No. 4 in D minor, opus 120. (The D-minor symphony is edited extensively by Schumann in 1851, and thus is given a much later opus number and subsequently referred to as No. 4, although it is actually his second.)
Tenor Domenico Donzelli retires from the stage.
Nikolay Afanas'yev resigns as concertmaster of the Bolshoi Theatre Orchestra in order to conduct the serf orchestra of a wealthy landowner at Vïksa, near St Petersburg.

Popular music 
August Heinrich Hoffmann – "Deutschlandlied" (to music written in 1797 by Joseph Haydn)

Classical music 
Adolphe Adam – Giselle (ballet)
Hector Berlioz 
Rêverie et Caprice, H 88
Les nuits d'été
Frederic Chopin 
Ballade No. 3
Fantaisie in F minor
Theodor Kullak – Cavatine de Robert le Diable
Friedrich August Kummer – 2 Concert Duos for Violin and Cello, Op. 67
Joseph Lanner – Abend-Sterne Walzer, Op.180
Henry Lemoine – Études enfantines, Op. 37
Jans Christian Lumbye – Döbler's Zauber Galop
Felix Mendelssohn 
Variations sérieuses
Antigone, Op. 55
Allegro brillant, Op.92
Clara Schumann 
Die gute Nacht, die ich dir sage
Lieder, Op. 12
Robert Schumann 
Symphony No.1, Op. 38
Overture, Scherzo and Finale, Op. 52
Symphony No.4, Op. 120
Fernando Sor 
Le calme, Op. 50
Divertissement for 2 Guitars, Op. 62
Johann Strauss Sr 
Amors-Pfeile, Op. 123
Elektrische Funken, Op. 125
Johannes Verhulst – Symphony in E minor

Opera 
Daniel Auber – Les diamants de la couronne
Michael William Balfe – Keolanthe
Gaetano Donizetti – Adelia
Fromental Halévy 
Charles VI
La reine de Chypre
Franz Lachner – Caterina Cornaro
Giovanni Pacini – L'uomo del mistero

Births 
January 15 – Thorvald Lammers, singer, conductor and composer (died 1922)
January 18 – Emmanuel Chabrier, composer (died 1894)
January 23 – Sigismund Bachrich, violinist and composer (died 1913)
January 28 – Viktor Nessler, composer (died 1890)
January 31 – Michael Maybrick, composer and singer, better known as "Stephen Adams" (died 1913)
February 10 – Sir Walter Parratt, organist and composer (died 1924)
February 19
Elfrida Andrée, organist, conductor and composer (died 1929)
Felipe Pedrell, composer (died 1922)
March 1 – Romualdo Marenco, composer for ballet (died 1907)
May 15 – Giovanni Bolzoni, violinist and composer (died 1919)
May 21 – Joseph Parry, composer (died 1903)
May 28 – Giovanni Sgambati, Italian composer, pianist, and conductor
June 16 – David Popper, cellist (died 1913)
July 9 – Carl Christian Lumbye, Danish composer, son of Hans Christian Lumbye
July 11 – Daniël de Lange, composer (died 1918)
July 18 – Hedvig Willman, Swedish opera singer (died 1887)
September 8 – Antonín Dvořák, composer (died 1904)
September 26 – Signor Brocolini, opera singer (died 1906)
October 11 – Friedrich Hegar, violinist, conductor and composer (died 1927)
November 4 – Karl Tausig, pianist and composer (died 1871)
November 29 – Joe Wilson, singer and songwriter (died 1875)
December 14 – Louise Héritte-Viardot, singer (died 1918)

Deaths 
January 25 – Maria Anna Thekla Mozart, "Marianne", cousin and correspondent of Wolfgang Amadeus Mozart (born 1758)
February 14 – Antun Sorkočević, diplomat, writer and composer (born 1775)
February 17 – Ferdinando Carulli, composer for guitar (born 1770)
May 18 – John Thomson, composer (born 1805)
June 12 – Konstantinos Nikolopoulos, archaeologist and composer (born 1786)
July 3 – Rosemond Mountain, actress and singer (born 1780s?)
August 13 – Bernhard Romberg, cellist and composer (born 1767)
August 24
Friedrich Curschmann, songwriter and singer (born 1805)
Theodore Hook, writer and composer (born 1788)
August 27 – Ignaz von Seyfried, conductor and composer (born 1776)
September 15 – Alessandro Rolla, violinist, composer and music teacher (born 1757)
September 16 – Thomas John Dibdin, songwriter (born 1771)
October 16 – Domenico Barbaia, impresario (born 1778)
October 28 – Francesco Morlacchi, composer (born 1784)
December 22 – Daniil Kashin, pianist, conductor and composer (born 1769)
date unknown – Justina Casagli, opera singer (born 1794) (suicide)

References 

 
19th century in music
Music by year